Foligno is a town in the region of Umbria, Italy, in the Province of Perugia.

Foligno may also refer to:

People
Marcus Foligno (born 1991), Canadian ice hockey player
Mike Foligno (born 1959), Canadian ice hockey player
Nick Foligno (born 1987), American ice hockey player
Angela of Foligno (1248 – 4 January 1309), Italian Franciscan tertiary
Felician of Foligno (c. 160 – c. 250), patron saint of Foligno
Gentile da Foligno (died 18 June 1348), Italian professor and doctor of medicine
Angelo da Foligno (1226 - 27 August 1312), Italian Roman Catholic priest

Other
Foligno Airport
Foligno Cathedral
A.S.D. Città di Foligno 1928
Madonna of Foligno, Italian High Renaissance painting
Roman Catholic Diocese of Foligno